Sudhir Memorial Institute may refer to:

 Sudhir Memorial Institute Tamluk